Alexander Frenkel (born 4 March 1985) is a Ukrainian and German former professional boxer who competed from 2006 to 2010. He won the European cruiserweight title in 2010 and retired undefeated in 2011.

Professional career
Frenkel made his professional debut on 23 September 2006, scoring a first-round stoppage over Anton Lascek. He won his first regional championship—the vacant IBF Youth cruiserweight title—on 17 May 2008, knocking out Cory Phelps in one round. After further knockout wins all throughout 2009, Frenkel won the European cruiserweight title on 18 September 2010 after a vicious knockout of defending champion Enzo Maccarinelli. In October 2011, having not fought in more than a year, Frenkel was forced to vacate the title.

Professional boxing record

References

External links

1985 births
Living people
Ukrainian male boxers
Sportspeople from Kropyvnytskyi
Ukrainian emigrants to Germany
Naturalized citizens of Germany
German male boxers
European Boxing Union champions
Cruiserweight boxers